The 2018 Trinidad and Tobago floods were a series of over-bank floods and flash-floods occurring in the twin-island Caribbean nation, Trinidad and Tobago. These events followed consistent rainfall on Friday 19 October 2018 and intermittent rainfall on Saturday 20 October 2018. Rivers in Caroni, Diego Martin and Maraval breached their banks. Several communities were evacuated as homes and vehicles were flooded; many areas were inaccessible. Flooding along the Caroni Plain caused the submersion of a major part of the Uriah Butler Highway. The south-bound lane of this highway was temporarily closed to vehicular traffic. The north-bound lane was temporarily used for two-way traffic, permitting only large SUVs and heavy-T vehicles. Flight services out of Piarco International Airport were temporarily disrupted.

Rainfall and Met Office warnings 
Consistent rainfall persisted throughout the day on Friday 19 October 2018. Trinidad and Tobago is located on the band of the Inter Tropical Convergence Zone (ITCZ), making it prone to over-bank river flooding, flash flooding, and landslides following extreme and erratic rainfall. The Trinidad and Tobago Meteorological Service (TTMS) upgraded the Riverine Flood Alert level from orange to red. Citizens were advised then to secure themselves and their property and execute emergency evacuation procedures.

Flooded roads and highways 
The following table (incomplete) shows some of the roadways and highways that were affected.

Landslides and landslips 
The following table shows a list (not yet complete) of landslides/landslips that have occurred.

References 

Trinidad and Tobago floods
2018 in Trinidad and Tobago
Floods in the Caribbean
Natural disasters in Trinidad and Tobago
October 2018 events in North America